Other People's Clothes is a novel written by German-American novelist Calla Henkel. Her debut novel, it was first published in 2021 by Sceptre, an imprint of Hachette.

Reception 
The novel was critically received. Rhiannon Lucy Cosslett writing for The Guardian called it a "A whirlwind of screwball comedy, murder and friendship that examines the cannibalisation of experience to feed social media".

References 

2021 American novels
2021 debut novels
Sceptre (imprint) books